Events in the year 2023 in North Macedonia.

Incumbents 

 President: Stevo Pendarovski
 Prime Minister: Dimitar Kovačevski

Events 
Ongoing — COVID-19 pandemic in North Macedonia

 14 January - Authorities arrested four police officers, including a police commander, under suspicion for helping a prisoner convicted of murder to escape. The prisoner was being transferred to a hospital.
 20 January - North Macedonia and Bulgaria denounces a hate crime that was committed against Hristian Pendikov, secretary of the Bulgarian cultural club Tsar Boris III, in Ohrid.

References 

2023 in North Macedonia
North Macedonia
North Macedonia